Mohamed Essam (born 6 December 1994) is an Egyptian fencer. He competed in the men's foil event at the 2016 Summer Olympics.

References

External links
 

1994 births
Living people
Egyptian male foil fencers
Olympic fencers of Egypt
Fencers at the 2016 Summer Olympics
Place of birth missing (living people)
African Games bronze medalists for Egypt
African Games medalists in fencing
Competitors at the 2015 African Games
Mediterranean Games competitors for Egypt
Competitors at the 2022 Mediterranean Games
21st-century Egyptian people